Windows Sound System (WSS) is a sound card specification developed by Microsoft released at the end of 1992 for Windows 3.1. WSS featured support for up to 16-bit, 48 kHz digital sampling, beyond the capabilities of the popular contemporary Sound Blaster Pro, although it was less frequently supported than Sound Blaster and Gravis sound cards, as well as Roland sound cards, daughterboards, and sound modules. In addition, the WSS featured RCA analog audio outputs, an uncommon feature among sound cards of this era; other connections were a microphone input, a stereo line input and a stereo headphone output.

The Windows Sound System was sold as a bundle which included an ISA sound card, a microphone, a pair of headphones and the software package.

WSS 1.0a drivers were released in February 1993. They introduced single-mode DMA, supported games in MS-DOS, Ad Lib and Sound Blaster emulation.WSS 2.0 drivers, released in October 1993, added support for OEM sound cards (Media Vision, Creative Labs, ESS Technology) and included an improved DOS driver (WSSXLAT.EXE) that provided Sound Blaster 16 compatibility for digital sampling. However, they did not provide support for FM or wavetable synthesis.

WSS was supported by most popular DOS sound libraries developed in the 1990s, such as the Miles Sound System and HMI Sound Operating System, and less popular ones, such as Loudness Sound System, Digital Sound Interface Kit, Digital Sound & Music Interface and Junglevision Sound Drive.

Much like today's Intel High Definition Audio, the actual hardware was standardized as well. WSS was based on Analog Devices AD1848 codec chip and mounted the Yamaha OPL3 (YMF262-M) FM synthesis sound chip on-board for MIDI files playback (supporting up to 20 simultaneous MIDI voices).

External links 

Microsoft Windows Sound System soundcards, YJFY Computer Component Museum

References
Sound cards